Protrinemurella is a genus of silverfish in the family Protrinemuridae. It comprises only the type species Protrinemurella allacrotelsoides Mendes, 2002, known from Thailand's Krabi province.

References

Further reading

 
 

Insect genera
Articles created by Qbugbot